Joseph Kahn may refer to:

Joseph Kahn (director) (born 1972), a film and music video director
Joseph Kahn (journalist) (born 1964), American journalist
Joseph Kahn (shipping executive) (1916–1979), American businessman

See also
Joseph Hahn (born 1977), the Linkin Park turntablist